Wintertide is an album by the Canadian guitarist Don Ross, released in 1996.

Reception

Music critic Roch Parisien, writing for Allmusic, wrote the album "[Ross] offers tasteful, often inventive arrangements of English, German, and French traditionals. Some harp, keyboard, trumpet and delicate percussion embellishments apply, but in general the sparser the better here."

Track listing
 "In the Bleak Midwinter"
 "The First Noel"
 "What Child Is This"
 "Bring a Torch, Jeanette Isabella"
 "Silent Night"
 "Lo, How a Rose E’er Blooming"
 "Once in Royal David’s City"
 "O Come, O Come, Emmanuel"
 "Jesu, Joy of Man's Desiring" (Johann Sebastian Bach)
 "Huron Carol"
 "God Rest You Merry Gentlemen"
 "The Coventry Carol"

Personnel
Don Ross – guitar

References

Don Ross (guitarist) albums
1996 Christmas albums
Christmas albums by Canadian artists
Folk rock Christmas albums